NLM CityHopper Flight 431 refers to a Fokker F-28-4000, registration PH-CHI, that was due to operate an international scheduled Rotterdam–Eindhoven–Hamburg passenger service. All 17 occupants of the aircraft – 13 passengers and 4 crew members– died in the accident.

Aircraft and crew 

The aircraft involved in the accident was a Fokker F28-4000, registration PH-CHI, that was built in 1979 with c/n 11141. At the time of the accident, the airframe had accumulated 4,485 flight hours and 5,997 cycles.

The captain was 33-year-old Jozef Werner, who had been with NLM CityHopper for nearly 11 years. He had 4,900 flight hours, including 309 hours on the Fokker F28. The first officer was 28-year-old Hendrik Schoorl, who had been with the airline for three years and had 2,971 flight hours, with 2,688 of them on the Fokker F28.

Description of the accident 
The aircraft took off at 17:04 CET (UTC +1) from RTM. The crew noted heavy rain in thunderstorms on the airplane's weather avoidance radar at 17:09, receiving clearance to avoid the area. At 17:12 the aircraft entered a tornado while flying through clouds. The weather system the aircraft entered into was apparently the same "tornado-like" system that Zeeland locals described as being responsible for considerable property damage. Meteorologically, these vortices are indeed tornadoes, and the disintegrating airliner was seen exiting cloud cover. A police officer first photographed the tornado, then smoke from the burning plane a few minutes later. An investigation concluded that a sharp increase in altitude registered on the altimeter was not a change in altitude, rather a pressure drop associated with the tornado.

Stresses experienced by the airframe owing to severe turbulence resulted in loads of +6.8 g and  −3.2 g causing the starboard wing to detach. The Fellowship was designed for a maximum G-load of up to 4 g. All 17 occupants of the aircraft perished in the accident. While observing the unfolding incident from the ground, a firefighter suffered a fatal cardiac arrest.

See also 
 List of accidents and incidents involving commercial aircraft

References

External links 

 Accident details at planecrashinfo.com

Airliner accidents and incidents caused by in-flight structural failure
Airliner accidents and incidents caused by weather
Aviation accidents and incidents in the Netherlands
Aviation accidents and incidents in 1981
Accidents and incidents involving the Fokker F28
NLM CityHopper accidents and incidents
1981 meteorology
Deaths in tornadoes
History of North Brabant
Moerdijk
October 1981 events in Europe